This uniform polyhedron compound is a composition of 5 great cubicuboctahedra, in the same arrangement as the compound of 5 truncated cubes.

References 
.

Polyhedral compounds